Město Albrechtice is a town in Bruntál District in the Moravian-Silesian Region of the Czech Republic. It has about 3,400 inhabitants. It is the largest municipality in the Osoblažsko microregion.

Administrative parts

Villages of Burkvíz, Česká Ves, Dlouhá Voda, Hynčice, Linhartovy, Opavice, Piskořov, Valštejn and Žáry are administrative parts of Město Albrechtice.

Geography
Město Albrechtice is located in the Zlatohorská Highlands and is the gateway to the Osoblažsko microregion.

History
The first written mention of Albrechtice is from 1377, in the deed of division of Duchy of Troppau and Duchy of Krnov. In 1474, the local fort was conquered and destroyed by the army of Matthias Corvinus. In 1492, during the rule of the Makrot family (1492–1503), Albrechtice was promoted to a town by King Vladislaus II.

In 1503, the estate was acquired by the Sup of Fulštejn family. From 1623 to 1773, it was owned by the Jesuits. Then Albrechtice was taken by the royal chamber and in 1776 it became a municipal town with its own self-government. The town was looted and badly damaged by Prussian army in 1779, during the War of the Bavarian Succession.

According to the Austrian census of 1910 the town had 2,438 inhabitants, all of them were German-speaking. Jews were not allowed to declare Yiddish, most of them thus declared the German language as their native. Most populous religious groups were Roman Catholics with 2,255 (92.5%), followed by Protestants with 161 (6.6%).

Transport
Město Albrechtice lies on the railway line from Krnov to Jeseník.

Sights

The landmark of the town square and the whole town is the Church of the Visitation of Our Lady. It was built in the late Baroque style in 1747–1752 and replaced an older church from 1610, which was destroyed by the fire in 1746. Other sights on the town square include the Column of St. Anne from 1719 and the Empire style house No. 21 with well-preserved renaissance interior (cross vault) from the second half of the 16th century.

The most important monument is the Linhartovy Castle in the eponymous village. It was built at the end of 16th century, converting the former fortress from the 14th century into a Renaissance mansion. The new owner, the Sedlnický of Choltice family, had rebuilt the castle to its present Baroque appearance in 1702, and a French-style park was founded. In the 19th century the park was converted into a nature landscape park. During the World War II the castle was damaged by a fire and in the following decades fell into disrepair. Today the castle is the town property, it is repaired and is open to public.

There are numerous folk architecture monuments in the town. The preserved folk architecture in Piskořov is protected by law as a village monument zone. In Hynčice there are many cottages from the 18th and 19th century and the church complex formed by the late Baroque Church of St. Nicholas from 1782, rectory, a chapel and a gate.

It was created in 2011 by connecting two unused antenna towers.

In Hynčice is located a private gallery of sculptures of life-size dinosaurs, sculptures, fairy-tale creatures and animals, called Eldorádo. It was established in the 1950s and is sometimes called as the first "dinopark" in the Czech Republic.

Sport
The town is equipped by an outdoor swimming pool.

Notable people
Gottfried Rieger (1764–1855), Bohemian kapellmeister
Leopold von Sedlnitzky (1787–1871), German bishop
Julio Deutsch (1859–1922), Croatian architect
Miloslav Gajdoš (born 1948), musician
Loukas Vyntra (born 1981), footballer

Twin towns – sister cities

Město Albrechtice is twinned with:
 Biała, Poland
 Głubczyce, Poland
 Komprachcice, Poland
 Precenicco, Italy

References

External links

Cities and towns in the Czech Republic
Populated places in Bruntál District